TV4 (in ), also known as Tamazight TV (in ), is the fourth Algerian public national television channel. It is part of the state-owned EPTV group, along with TV1, TV2, TV3 , TV5 and TV6, TV7, TV8 and TV9. It is a Tamazight language channel in its variations Kabylian-Berber, Tashawit-Berber, Tamasheq-Berber, Tashenwit-Berber and Tomzabt-Berber.

History
TV4 was launched on 18 March 2009 and started to broadcast its programs on 18 March 2009.

Programming

Sports competitions 
 Algerian Cup
 Algerian League

News Programs 
 ⵉⵙⴰⵍⴻⵏ 18h (Issalen 18h) | Journal 18h en Tamazight (Six O'clock News in Tamazight)

References

External links
  
 

Arab mass media
Television in Algeria
Television channels and stations established in 2009
Television stations in Algeria
Berber-language mass media